Cratoplastis rectiradia is a moth of the family Erebidae first described by George Hampson in 1901. It is found in Peru, French Guiana, Suriname, the Amazon region and Bolivia.

References

Phaegopterina
Moths of South America
Moths described in 1901